The following is a list of notable deaths in September 1996.

Entries for each day are listed alphabetically by surname. A typical entry lists information in the following sequence:
 Name, age, country of citizenship at birth, subsequent country of citizenship (if applicable), reason for notability, cause of death (if known), and reference.

September 1996

1
Jimmy Duncanson, 76, Scottish football player.
Vagn Holmboe, 86, Danish composer and teacher.
Andrew Hughes, 88, Turkish-Japanese film actor and business executive.
Karl Kehrle, 98, German-British Benedictine monk and bee breeding authority.
Ion Oblemenco, 51, Romanian football striker, heart attack.
Nyi Pu, 95, Burmese actor and film director.
Hugo Scheltema, 78, Dutch diplomat and ambassador.
Ljuba Welitsch, 83, Bulgarian singer.

2
André Chastagnol, 76, French historian.
Karl Frenzel, 85, German Nazi war criminal.
Georgi Georgiev-Getz, 69, Bulgarian film and stage actor, stroke.
Paddy Clift, 43, Zimbabwean cricket player, bone marrow cancer.
Charles Kirbo, 79, American lawyer and longtime advisor to Jimmy Carter.
Wes Livengood, 86, American baseball player, scout and manager.
Otto Luening, 96, German-American composer and conductor.
Aleksandr Markin, 46, Soviet football player, accident.
Aldo Montano, 85, Italian fencer.

3
Veniamin Basner, 71, Soviet/Russian composer.
Robert Brown, 75, English politician, born 1921.
Walter Forster, 79, Brazilian actor, heart attack.
Emily Kngwarreye, 86, Aboriginal Australian artist from Utopia, Northern Territory.
Valeri Kravchenko, 57, Soviet/Russian volleyball player.
Julian Amery, Baron Amery of Lustleigh, 77, British politician.
Og Mandino, 72, American author.
Alba Roballo, 88, Uruguayan lawyer, poet, and politician.
Hugh Torney, 42, Irish National Liberation Army paramilitary leader, shot.
Edward Turkington, 97, American rugby union player.

4
Victor Aaron, 39, American actor (Geronimo: An American Legend, King of the Hill, Sunchaser), traffic collision.
Joan Clarke, 79, English cryptanalyst and numismatist.
Babe Dahlgren, 84, American baseball player.
Ilus W. Davis, 79, American mayor.
George Huebner, 85, American executive engineer (Chrysler Corporation), pulmonary edema.
Jeanne Juilla, 86, French model and actress.
Bill MacPhail, 76, American television executive.
Julio Musimessi, 72, Argentine football player.
Wee Willie Smith, 86, American football player.

5
Leonard Katzman, 69, American film and television producer, writer and director, heart attack.
Anthony Mendleson, 81, British costume designer.
Anselm Strauss, 79, American medical sociologist.
Clem Thomas, 67, Welsh rugby player.
John White, 71, Canadian politician.
Misa Yamamura, 62, Japanese novelist and a mystery writer, heart failure.

6
Ginette Martenot, 94, French musician.
Barney McCosky, 79, American Major League Baseball player.
Darío Espina Pérez, 75, Cuban banker, lawyer, and writer.
Salman Shah, 24, Bangladeshi actor, suicide.
Daniel Shanks, 79, American mathematician.
Ester Soré, 81, Chilean singer, Diabetic coma.
Michael Torrence, 35, American serial killer, execution by lethal injection.
Douglas Franklin Wright, 56, American serial killer, execution by lethal injection.

7
Bibi Besch, 54, Austrian-American actress (Star Trek II: The Wrath of Khan, Steel Magnolias, Tremors), breast cancer.
Joseph Biroc, 93, American cinematographer (The Towering Inferno, It's a Wonderful Life, Airplane!), Oscar winner (1975).
Arda Bowser, 97, American gridiron football player.
Niccolò Castiglioni, 64, Italian musician.
Bruno Corbucci, 64, Italian film director.
Arthur Sherwood Flemming, 91, American government official, renal failure.
Keith Forbes, 90, Australian rules football player.
Gilda, 34, Argentine singer, traffic collision.
Willy Miranda, 70, Cuban-American baseball player.
Vyacheslav Solovyov, 71, Soviet/Russian football player and coach.

8
Semyon Aranovich, 62, Soviet/Russian film director, cancer.
Eyre de Lanux, 102, American artist, writer, and art deco designer.
Onib Olmedo, 59, Filipino painter.
Jacques Schmidt, 63, French costume designer.

9
Raúl Calvo, 79, Argentinian basketball player.
Harry Hanebrink, 68, American baseball player, aneurysm.
Shiva Nath Katju, 86, Indian lawyer, judge and an Indian National Congress politician.
Ruggero Mastroianni, 66, Italian film editor, heart attack.
Bill Monroe, 84, American "father of bluegrass" music, stroke.
Robert Nisbet, 82, American sociologist.
John W. Tuthill, 85, American diplomat.

10
Latifa al-Zayyat, 73, Egyptian activist and writer, cancer.
Ray Coleman, 59, British journalist and writer.
Joanne Dru, 74, American actress, edema.
Plantagenet Somerset Fry, 65, British historian and author, suicide.
Hans List, 100, Austrian automotive pioneer.
Julia Morton, 84, American author and botanist.
Stig Norén, 88, Swedish general and commander of the air force.
Sapphire, 61, American professional wrestler and manager, heart attack.
Pete Stout, 73, American National Football League player (Washington Redskins).

11
Guido Aristarco, 77, Italian film critic and author.
Bráz, 75, Brazilian basketball player.
Klára Fehér, 74, Hungarian writer.
Louise Fitch, 81, American actress.
Brenda Forbes, 87, British-American actress, cancer.
Dan Mahoney, 87, Australian politician.
Deane Waldo Malott, 98, American academic and administrator.
Thomas J. O'Connor, 71, American politician.
Koichi Oita, 82, Japanese football player and manager, heart failure.

12
Nikolay Avkhimovich, 89, Soviet and Belarusian politician.
Frank Christie, 69, Scottish football player and manager.
Eleazar de Carvalho, 84, Brazilian conductor and composer.
Ernesto Geisel, 89, Brazilian general and former president of Brazil, cancer.
Ricardo López, 21, Uruguayan-American stalker of musician Björk, suicide by gunshot.
James Scott-Elliot, 93, British Army officer.

13
Marvin Allen, 81, American soccer coach.
Jane Baxter, 87, British actress, stomach cancer.
James F. Bonner, 86, American molecular biologist.
César Mendoza Durán, 78, Chilean police officer, equestrian and member of the Government Junta, pancreatic cancer.
Tupac Shakur, 25, American rapper ("California Love", "Dear Mama") and actor (Poetic Justice), shot.
Wang Shoudao, 90, Chinese politician.
Xosé Filgueira Valverde, 89, Spanish writer, intellectual, and researcher, .
William Ayres Ward, 68, American Egyptologist.
Leni Wylliams, 35, African-American dancer/choreographer/master-teacher, murder.

14
Helen Cohan, 86, American stage dancer and film actress.
Jock Cordner, 86, Australian rules football player.
Edred John Henry Corner, 90, botanist and a mycologist.
Douglas Everett, 91, American ice hockey player.
Joe E. Martin, 80, American boxing coach.
Rose Ouellette, 93, Quebec actress, comedian, and theatre manager.
Juliet Prowse, 59, dancer and actress, pancreatic cancer.

15
Phil Farbman, 72, American basketball player.
Joe Maniaci, 82, American football player and coach.
Agnes Mongan, 91, American art historian.
Erling Nielsen, 61, Danish football player.
Tom Payne, 81, Brazilian film director, screenwriter and actor.
Andy Pilney, 83, American gridiron football player and coach, baseball player.
Ottis Toole, 49, American drifter and serial killer, cirrhosis.
Georgios Vafopoulos, 93, Greek poet, author, and journalist.

16
McGeorge Bundy, 77, American academic, heart attack.
Karl Dröse, 82, German field hockey player.
Rolf Graae, 79, Danish architect and organ designer.
Gene Nelson, 76, American actor, dancer, screenwriter, and director, cancer.
Joan Perry, 85, American film actress, model, and singer, emphysema.

17
Spiro Agnew, American politician, 77, 39th Vice President of the United States, leukemia.
Marianne Bachmeier, 46, German vigilante, pancreatic cancer.
Teodoro Fernández, 83, Peruvian footballer.
Jessie Hill, 63, American R&B and Louisiana blues singer and songwriter, heart and renal failure.
Paul J. Krebs, 84, American labor union official and politician.
Arnold Peters, 74, Canadian politician.
Henk Schijvenaar, 78, Dutch footballer.

18
Annabella, 89, French cinema actress, heart attack.
Ulrich Beiger, 78, German actor.
Corrie Laddé, 80, Dutch swimmer and Olympian.
Ronald McNicoll, 90, Australian Army general.
Raymond Lee Stewart, 44, American spree killer, execution by lethal injection.
Bai Yang, 76, Chinese actress.

19
Noureddine Aba, 75, Algerian poet and playwright.
Nanny Fernandez, 77, American baseball player.
Helmut Heißenbüttel, 75, German novelist and poet, pneumonia.
George Hunt, 86, English footballer, Alzheimer's disease.
Douglas Hyde, 85, English political journalist and writer.
Irene Mann, 67, German dancer, actress and choreographer.
Ștefan Mihăilescu-Brăila, 71, Romanian actor, Alzheimer's disease.
Czesław Petelski, 73, Polish film director and screenwriter.
Edilberto K. Tiempo, 83, Filipino professor, writer.

20
Franco Angrisano, 70, Italian actor, heart attack.
Murtaza Bhutto, 42, Pakistani politician and lmilitant leader, police encounter, homicide.
S. F. Brownrigg, 58, American film director and producer.
Paul Draper, 86, American tap dancer and choreographer, pulmonary emphysema.
Paul Erdős, 83, Hungarian mathematician, heart attack.
Krešo Golik, 74, Croatian film and television director and screenwriter.
Reuben Kamanga, 67, Zambian politician.
Max Manus, 81, Norwegian resistance fighter during World War II.
Dagdu Maruti Pawar, 61, Indian writer.
Ted Platt, 75, English football player.
William S. Vaughn, 92, American businessman and philanthropist.
Paul Weston, 84, American pianist, arranger, composer, and conductor.

21
Erika Cremer, 96, German chemist.
Paolo De Poli, 91, Italian enameller and painter.
Lamar Dodd, 87, American artist.
Claus Holm, 78, German film actor.
Leo Isacson, 86, American attorney and politician, cancer.
Henri Nouwen, 64, Dutch Catholic priest, writer and theologian, heart attack.
Franz Pfnür, 87, German alpine skier, Olympic champion and SS officer during World War II.
Ashoke Kumar Sen, 82, Indian lawyer and politician.
Julius Silverman, 90, British politician.
Sabine Zlatin, 89, Polish-French Resistance member during World War II.

22
Mohamed Ben Ahmed Abdelghani, 69, Algerian politician and prime Minister.
Brook Bernacchi, 74, British lawyer and politician in Hong Kong, brain cancer.
Ludmilla Chiriaeff, 72, Soviet-Canadian ballet dancer and choreographer.
Dorothy Lamour, 81, American actress (Road to ...) and singer, heart attack.
József Sir, 84, Hungarian athlete.
Svetislav Valjarević, 85, Yugoslav football player.
Marko Valok, 69, Serbian football player.
Joanne Winter, 71, American baseball player and golfer.

23
Bimal Kumar Bachhawat, 71, Indian neurochemist and glycobiologist.
Joe Borowski, 62, Canadian politician and activist.
Fujiko F. Fujio, 62, Japanese manga cartoonist, liver disease.
Károly Kárpáti, 90, Hungarian Olympic wrestling champion.
Jack Newman, 94, New Zealand cricket player and business executive.
Diarmuid O'Neill, 27, Norther Irish volunteer in the Provisional Irish Republican Army (IRA), killed.
Stuart Piggott, 86, British archaeologist, heart attack.
František Rauch, 86, Czech music educator and pianist.
Silk Smitha, 35, Indian actress and dancer, suicide by hanging.

24
I. E. S. Edwards, 87, British egyptologist and curator.
Red Embree, 79, American Major League Baseball pitcher.
Mark Frankel, 34, British actor, traffic accident.
Zeki Müren, 64, Turkish singer, composer, songwriter, actor and poet, heart attack.
Mário Palmério, 80, Brazilian writer.
Pavel Sudoplatov, 89, Soviet lieutenant general and spy.
Jannes van der Wal, 39, Dutch draughts player, leukemia.

25
Red Mihalik, 80, Poliosh-American basketball player and referee.
Richard Holt Locke, 55, American actor in gay erotic films and AIDS educator and activist, complications of AIDS.
Helgi Skúlason, 63, Icelandic actor and stage director.
George Veneroso, 87, American football coach.

26
Nicu Ceaușescu, 45, Romanian politician, son of Nicolae Ceaușescu and Elena Ceaușescu, liver cirrhosis.
Bob Davidson, 84, Canadian ice hockey player.
Heinz Engelmann, 85, German actor.
Alicja Iwańska, 78, Polish sociologist, academic and writer, lung cancer.
Jozef Marko, 73, Slovak football player.
Lucia Valerio, 91, Italian tennis player.
Geoffrey Wilkinson, 75, British chemist and Nobel Prize laureate.

27
Hermine Baron, 83, American contract bridge.
James Franklin Battin, 71, American politician and United States federal judge.
Jila Hosseini, 32, Iranian poet, writer, researcher and radio announcer, car accident.
Bruce Konopka, 77, American baseball player.
Garland Lawing, 78, American baseball player.
Mohammad Najibullah, 49, Afghan politician and President of Afghanistan, execution by hanging.
Ahmad Muhammad Numan, 87, Yemeni educator, propagandist and politician.
Lee Tit, 83, Cantonese film director.

28
Giuseppe Bartolomei, 73, Italian politician.
Menato Boffa, 66, Italian racecar driver.
Marcos Aurelio Di Paulo, 76, Argentinian football player.
Bob Gibson, 64, American folk singer and musician, progressive supranuclear palsy.
August Maus, 81, German Navy officer and World War II submarine commander.
Andrei Suraikin, 47, Russian figure skater.
Maurice Valency, 93, American writer and playwright.

29
Claire Bonenfant, 71, Canadian politician and feminist.
Leslie Crowther, 63, English comedian, actor, TV presenter, and game show host, heart failure.
Shusaku Endo, 73, Japanese author, complications of hepatitis.
Bohuslav Karlík, 87, Czechoslovak canoeist and water slalomist.
Li Qiang, 91, Chinese revolutionary, secret agent, and politician, liver cancer.
George Rung, 80, American basketball coach.

30
Charlie Adam, 77, Scottish football player.
Aubrey Brabazon, 76, Irish horse racing jockey.
Kenneth Muir, 89, English literary scholar and author.
P. Jay Sidney, 81, American actor.
Moneta Sleet, Jr., 70, American journalist, cancer.
Sylvester William Treinen, 78, American Roman catholic bishop.

References 

1996-09
 09